Michael Timothy Walsh (March 25, 1886 – January 21, 1947) was a Major League Baseball player. Walsh played for the Philadelphia Phillies, the Baltimore Terrapins, and the St. Louis Terriers. He batted and threw right-handed.

He was born in Lima, Ohio, and died in Baltimore, Maryland.

In 502 games over six seasons, Walsh posted a .285 batting average (447-for-1571) with 178 runs, 25 home runs, 212 RBI, 45 stolen bases and 101 bases on balls.

Although his primary position was third base, he played at least one game at every position in his major league career.

External links

1886 births
1947 deaths
Baseball players from Ohio
Major League Baseball third basemen
Philadelphia Phillies players
Baltimore Terrapins players
St. Louis Terriers players
Meridian Ribboners players
South Bend Greens players